Vuko Tomašević (born 13 May 1980 in Sydney, New South Wales, Australia) is an Australian footballer.

Biography
Tomasevic is best known for putting into the net one of the all-time great National Soccer League goals with the Northern Spirit during their 2002–03 campaign. Along with the Spirit, he has also helped take Bonnyrigg White Eagles to second place in 2004–05 and then assisted Marconi Stallions to third in the following season. Tomasevic represented Australia in 2005 at the FIFA Beach Soccer World Cup.

External links
 Player Profile at Central Coast Mariners Official Site

Notes

1980 births
Living people
Soccer players from Sydney
Australian people of Serbian descent
Australia youth international soccer players
A-League Men players
National Soccer League (Australia) players
Bonnyrigg White Eagles FC players
Central Coast Mariners FC players
Marconi Stallions FC players
Northern Spirit FC players
National Premier Leagues players
Association football defenders
Expatriate footballers in Fiji
Australian soccer players